Livingstone's flycatcher (Erythrocercus livingstonei) is a species of bird in the family Erythrocercidae.
It is found in Malawi, Mozambique, Tanzania, Zambia, and Zimbabwe.
Its natural habitats are subtropical or tropical dry forests and subtropical or tropical moist shrubland.

References

External links
 Livingstone's flycatcher - Species text in The Atlas of Southern African Birds.

Livingstone's flycatcher
Birds of East Africa
Livingstone's flycatcher
Livingstone's flycatcher
Taxonomy articles created by Polbot